Eirene Lloyd White, Baroness White (née Jones; 7 November 1909 – 23 December 1999) was a British Labour politician and journalist.

Early life 
White was born in Belfast, the daughter of Dr Thomas Jones, commonly known as "TJ", a noted civil servant, educationalist and friend of the establishment.  She was educated at St Paul's Girls' School, London, and Somerville College, Oxford, where she read Philosophy, Politics and Economics. She spent a year in Heidelberg before working for the New York Public Library. Back in England, she studied housing policies and the problems of the homeless.

Career
During World War II, White joined the Women's Voluntary Service and became Welsh Regional Secretary. She was recruited by the Ministry of Labour to help with the training of workers in Wales, particularly women, for the war effort.
She also worked as a civil servant at the Board of Education until 1945 and after the War as a political correspondent for both the Manchester Evening News and the BBC.  In 1948, she married fellow House of Commons lobby correspondent John Cameron White.

White stood in the 1945 general election in Flintshire without success. She was elected a member of the Labour Party's National Executive Committee in the women's section in 1947. She was elected Labour MP for East Flint in 1950, one of the first female MPs in Wales. An early private member's bill encouraged the government to relax divorce laws. Annoyed by fights between left and right, she stepped down from the NEC in 1953 but returned in 1959 until 1972.

When Labour came to power under Harold Wilson in 1964, White became parliamentary under-secretary at the Colonial Office, in 1966 Minister of State for Foreign Affairs and in 1967 Minister of State at the Welsh Office for three years. White managed to hang on to her marginal constituency for 20 years, at one election by just 72 votes.

White served as chairman of the Fabian Society and of the Labour Party NEC 1968–9. She was a governor of the British Film Institute and a member of the board of Trade Films Council.

In 1970, she retired from the House of Commons and was created a life peer on 12 October 1970 taking the title Baroness White, of Rhymney in the County of Monmouth. Later posts included president of Coleg Harlech and governor of the National Library of Wales. She was chairman of the Land Authority for Wales (1976–80), deputy chairman of the Metrication Board (1972–76), and a member of the Royal Commission on Environment Pollution (1974–81). She was Deputy Speaker of the House of Lords from 1979 to 1989. She was awarded an Honorary Degree (Doctor of Laws) from the University of Bath in 1983.

On 10 June 2022, a purple plaque was unveiled at Flint Town Hall in her honour, recognizing the fact that she was one of the first three women to represent Wales in the UK Parliament, and indeed Wales's only female MP for ten years.

Personal life

In 1948, she married fellow House of Commons lobby correspondent John Cameron White (1911–1968). They had no children.

Death
She died, aged 90, in Abergavenny.

A viewfinder monument was erected on the summit of Allt yr Esgair 393 metres/1290 feet (Grid Ref SO126243).

References

External links

 https://www.theguardian.com/news/1999/dec/27/guardianobituaries Obituary in The Guardian
 Eirene White Papers at the National Library of Wales
 Eirene White at the Dictionary of Welsh Biography

 
 
 

1909 births
1999 deaths
20th-century British women politicians
Alumni of Somerville College, Oxford
Chairs of the Fabian Society
Chairs of the Labour Party (UK)
Life peeresses created by Elizabeth II
Female members of the Parliament of the United Kingdom for Welsh constituencies
White, Eirene White, Baroness
Members of the Fabian Society
Ministers in the Wilson governments, 1964–1970
UK MPs 1950–1951
UK MPs 1951–1955
UK MPs 1955–1959
UK MPs 1959–1964
UK MPs 1964–1966
UK MPs 1966–1970
UK MPs who were granted peerages
Welsh Labour Party MPs
20th-century British journalists